Clésio Soares de Andrade (born October 12, 1952) is a Brazilian politician and businessman. He represented Minas Gerais in the Federal Senate from 2011 to 2014. Previously, he was Vice-Governor of Minas Gerais from 2003 to 2006. He is a member of the Brazilian Democratic Movement Party.

As president of the National Confederation of Transport (CNT) he has defended tax cuts for public transport corporations.

References

Living people
1952 births
Pontifical Catholic University of Minas Gerais alumni
Members of the Federal Senate (Brazil)
Brazilian Democratic Movement politicians
Brazilian businesspeople
People from Minas Gerais